Tovar may refer to:

People
Tovar (surname)
 Tovar, a fictional character from The Strangerhood
 Tovar Perri

Places
 Tobar or Tovar, a Spanish village ruled by the Tovar family in the Middle-Ages, place of origin of the Tovar surname
 Tovar Municipality, Mérida, Mérida (state), Venezuela
 Tovar Municipality, Aragua, Venezuela
 Colonia Tovar in Tovar Municipality, Aragua
 El Tovar Hotel in Arizona, United States

See also

Operation Tovar, international operation against computer fraud
Tova (disambiguation)